Robert Foligny Broussard (August 17, 1864 – April 12, 1918) was both a U.S. representative and a U.S. senator from Louisiana. He was born on the Mary Louise plantation near New Iberia, the seat of Iberia Parish, to Jean Dorville Broussard, and his wife Anastasie Elizadie Gonsoulin Broussard.

Career

Broussard attended Georgetown University in Washington, D.C., from 1879-82. He was a night inspector of customs in New Orleans from 1885–88, when he was appointed assistant weigher and statistician. He held that position in 1888-89. He graduated from the Tulane University Law School in 1889. He was admitted to the bar the same year and launched his practice in New Iberia. He was elected prosecuting attorney of the Nineteenth Judicial District and held that office from 1892 to 1897.

Broussard was elected as a Democrat to the Fifty-fifth and to the eight succeeding Congresses (March 4, 1897 – March 4, 1915). While in the House of Representative, he was chairman of the Committee on Expenditures in the Department of Justice (Sixty-third Congress); he did not seek renomination in 1914, having become a candidate for Senator. He was elected to the Senate already on 21 May 1912 and served from March 4, 1915 until his death three years later in New Iberia. In the Senate he was chairman of the Committee on National Banks (Sixty-fourth and Sixty-fifth Congresses).

Broussard introduced the "American Hippo Bill", H.R. 23261, in 1910. This bill proposed $250,000 in funding from the federal government to import the hippopotamus from Africa in order to solve two problems at once: the meat shortage in the United States and the invasive plant-species called the Water Hyacinth invading Louisiana's waterways.

See also
 List of United States Congress members who died in office (1900–49)

References

Robert F. Broussard, late a senator from Louisiana, Memorial addresses delivered in the House of Representatives and Senate frontispiece 1919

1864 births
1918 deaths
People from New Iberia, Louisiana
Cajun people
Louisiana lawyers
Tulane University Law School alumni
Democratic Party United States senators from Louisiana
Democratic Party members of the United States House of Representatives from Louisiana
19th-century American politicians
19th-century American lawyers